Karkuh (also Romanized as Kārkūh; also known as Kārkū) is a village in Goli Jan Rural District, in the Central District of Tonekabon County, Mazandaran Province, Iran. At the 2006 census, its population was 363, in 93 families.

References 

Populated places in Tonekabon County